Ababil means a "Flock of Birds". It refers to the miraculous birds in Islamic belief mentioned in  Surah Al-Fil of the Quran that protected the Kaaba in Mecca from the Aksumite elephant army of Abraha, then self-styled governor of Himyar, by dropping small clay stones on them as they approached. In the translation of sahih international, the phrase "tayran abābīl(a)"(طَيْرًا أَبَابِيلَ) is translated as "Birds in flocks" that is mentioned in the verse 105:3.

The event is said to have occurred in 570, the year that the Islamic prophet Muhammad was born.

References 

Islamic honorifics
Islamic legendary creatures
Legendary birds
Quranic figures